Diatraea minimifacta is a moth in the family Crambidae. It was described by Harrison Gray Dyar Jr. in 1911. It is found in Trinidad and Tobago, Costa Rica, Mexico (Tabasco) and Venezuela.

References

Chiloini
Moths described in 1911